Ruzawi School is an Anglican, independent, co-educational, preparatory, boarding school for children aged 6 to 12. It is located near the town of Marondera in Zimbabwe. Ruzawi, which was founded by Robert Grinham and Maurice Carver, has a pupil population ranging from 205 to 220 depending on the balance of boys and girls and the number of pupils in each age group. In the Infants' Department there is one class each for Grade One and Grade Two. An additional entry point at Grade Three enables there to be two classes from that level up to Grade 7. The school is situated some five kilometres south of Marondera in extensive grounds surrounded by many hectares of indigenous miombo woodland and exotic eucalyptus plantations.

Ruzawi School is a member of the Association of Trust Schools (ATS) and the Head is a member of the Conference of Heads of Independent Schools in Zimbabwe (CHISZ).

History 
In 1926, Robert Grinham and Maurice Carver decided to establish a boys' school in Southern Africa. South Africa was a possible venue but eventually it was decided to establish the school in Zimbabwe (then Southern Rhodesia). Various sites were visited in and around the capital but the most suitable venue was a few miles south of the then village of Marandellas, now Marondera.

The old Ruzawi Inn, for many years a staging post on the carriage and wagon route from the capital to the eastern border, was up for sale. Neither the new road nor the recently built railway passed close to the Inn, which was no longer, an essential stopping place for travelers. The bedrooms, dining room, kitchen and ancillary buildings proved ideal as both accommodation and classrooms for the newly established boys' boarding school.
An important use was found for the old stable building close to the inn. It was appropriately converted into the School Chapel. The building, now over a hundred years old, is equally appropriately in use as the School Museum. The founders of Ruzawi enlisted academic and domestic staff to help convert the Inn to a boys' boarding school. At the time, the boys attending Ruzawi ranged in age from seven to fourteen years.

From 1932 to 1934 plans were discussed and finance arranged to replace the old buildings with the present large dormitory block. It became known as the Birchenough Building in recognition of the work Sir Henry Birchenough did on behalf of the school, particularly in the field of raising funds for the new buildings. Other major events in the school's history include the building of the Robert Grinham Hall and the Maurice Carver Music Centre, the establishment of the Computer Centre.

In 1955, the School Chapel was built. The Chapel is a memorial to the Ruzawi boys who died in the Second World War.

In 1978, The Grinham Carver Trust was founded by the Ruzawi Old Boys Association (now the Ruzawi Old Pupils Association) on the occasion of its 25th anniversary and in honour of the school's founders.

In 2003, Ruzawi School became co-educational with the acceptance of girls into the school's student body.

In 2013, Ruzawi became a registered Cambridge International Examinations centre and adopted the Cambridge Primary curriculum.

Motto

Academics 
Ruzawi School, alongside the ZIMSEC Primary curriculum, adopted the Cambridge Primary curriculum which was developed by Cambridge International Examinations.

Sports 
Ruzawi School offers the following sports: athletics, cricket, cross-country, hockey, netball, rugby, swimming and tennis.

Clubs and Societies 
Ruzawi School has the following cultural and extramural activities: Ballet, Conservation Club, Cub Scouts, Design and Technology Club, Golf, Guitar, Music & Drama, Squash, Table Tennis, WildLife Quiz.

Houses 
Within the school, students are divided up into two 'houses' that compete along academic and sporting lines. The houses are named Grenfell, represented by olive green and named after Julian Grenfell the first born of William Grenfell – Baron of Desborough; and Fairbridge, represented by light blue and named after Kingsley Fairbridge, a South African educator and statesman. The link between the houses, comes from the apt and fierce competition between Julian and Kingsley at Oxford University in the sport of Boxing.

Notable alumni 
 Andy Blignaut - former Zimbabwean Cricketer
 Ryan Higgins - former England under-19 cricketer
 Kennedy Tsimba - former Zimbabwean rugby union player
 Guy Whittall - former Zimbabwean cricketer

See also 

 Springvale House
 List of schools in Zimbabwe

References

External links 
 Ruzawi School Official website
 Ruzawi School Profile on the ATS website

Educational institutions established in 1928
Anglican schools in Zimbabwe
Private schools in Zimbabwe
Cambridge schools in Zimbabwe
Co-educational schools in Zimbabwe
Boarding schools in Zimbabwe
Marondera
Buildings and structures in Mashonaland East Province
Education in Mashonaland East Province
Member schools of the Association of Trust Schools
1920s establishments in Southern Rhodesia
1928 establishments in the British Empire